How Not to Summon a Demon Lord is a Japanese light novel series written by Yukiya Murasaki, illustrated by Takahiro Tsurusaki, and published by Kodansha under their Ranobe Bunko imprint since December 2014. J-Novel Club licensed the novels. While the manga adaptation of the series is written by Naoto Fukuda. It launched on Kodansha's Niconico manga service Suiyōbi no Sirius in June 2015. The manga is licensed by Seven Seas Entertainment.


Light novels

Manga

Chapters not yet in tankōbon format
The following chapters have not yet been collected in tankōbon format:

References

How Not to Summon a Demon Lord
How Not to Summon a Demon Lord